Vielka Veronica Valenzuela Lama (born November 7, 1972, in New York, New York, U.S.) is a Dominican talk show host and former Miss Dominican Republic. Raised  in Concepción de la Vega, Dominican Republic, she worked in television in the Dominican Republic prior to moving to Mexico where she worked in telenovelas. She hosted Hoy and now hosts the show Estrellas hoy that airs on Estrella TV.

References

External links
 

1972 births
Dominican Republic beauty pageant winners
Dominican American
Dominican Republic expatriates in Mexico
Living people
Miss Dominican Republic
Miss Universe 1994 contestants
People from La Vega Province